The Happy Egg Company is an American egg producer headquartered in Rogers, Arkansas. It is the first commercial egg producer in the U.S. to be certified by the American Humane Association.

History
The Happy Egg Company was established in the United States in 2012, reporting sales of one million eggs by 2014. The Happy Egg Company relocated its headquarters from San Francisco to Rogers in 2018.

Operations
The Happy Egg Company contracts with family farms in the American South and Midwest for its products. The company has been a philanthropic supporter of the Northwest Arkansas Children's Shelter and is the only Whole30-approved egg brand. The Happy Egg Company's eggs are Certified Free Range by the American Humane Association (AHA) and its hens have access to more than eight acres of pasture. It is the first commercial egg producer in the U.S. to be certified by the AHA.

Products
As of 2020, The Happy Egg Company marketed three products: Organic Free Range, Free Range, and Free Range Blue & Brown Heritage Breed.

See also
 Sustainable agriculture

References

Further reading
 

Poultry companies
Food and drink companies based in Arkansas
Rogers, Arkansas
Food and drink companies established in 2012
American companies established in 2012
Eggs (food)
Food manufacturers of the United States
2012 establishments in Arkansas